Thomas Aylmer Pearson Hackett was Dean of Limerick from  1913 to 1928.

He was born on 5 December 1854  and educated at Trinity College, Dublin. After curacies at Coleraine and Newcastle he was Rector of Kilmallock from  1881 to 1910. He was Archdeacon of Limerick from then until his elevation to the Deanery.

He died on 4 December 1928.

Notes

External links

 

1854 births
Alumni of Trinity College Dublin
Deans of Limerick
1928 deaths
Archdeacons of Limerick